Melittis melissophyllum is a species of flowering plant in the mint family, Lamiaceae. Its common name is bastard balm. It is the only species in the monotypic genus Melittis. The genus name is derived from the Greek melitta, which is in turn from melissa ("a bee").

Subspecies
Melittis melissophyllum subsp. albida (Guss.) P.W.Ball - eastern Mediterranean from Sardinia to Turkey
Melittis melissophyllum subsp. carpatica (Klokov) P.W.Ball - eastern Europe from Austria to Baltic States 
Melittis melissophyllum subsp. melissophyllum - western Europe from Britain to Spain + Italy

Distribution
It is native to central and southern Europe from the British Isles + Portugal east to Turkey + Ukraine + Baltic States.

Description
It is a strongly aromatic plant with erect hairy stems. The root of this plant is a perennial short rhizome. This species is quite variable in shape of leaves and colors. The leaves reach  of length. They are oval, bluntly-toothed, quite hairy. They have a short petiole and are in opposite pairs up the stems. The inflorescence is composed of large pedunculated hermaphrodite flowers (two to six, or more)  growing in the axils of the leaves. The flowers are labiate, arranged in pairs and are one-sided (all flowers "look" at the same side). They are usually white or pale pink with a large pinkish purple blotch on the lower lip. They are mainly pollinated by bees and moths. The flowering period extends from May through August.

Habitat
The plant grows in shady deciduous woods, often with oak, beech, and chestnut. It can also be found among pines and junipers.

Cultivation
Bastard balm grows well as an edging in a sunny woodland or a scrubby border. It is attractive to insects. Cultivars include 'Royal Velvet Distinction'.

Gallery

Notes

References
 Pignatti S. - Flora d'Italia - Edagricole – 1982 Vol. II, pg. 452
 Pink, A. -  Gardening for the Million (2004) - Project Gutenberg|Project Gutenberg Literary Archive Foundation|  Gardening for the Million 
 Klein Carol - How to grow Melittis melissophyllum - The Daily Telegraph - How to grow 
 Canadian Food Inspection Agency: Plant Breeders' Rights Office: "Royal Velvet Distinction" - 30 Apr 2007 - Melittis melissophyllum

External links
 Biolib
 Melittis melissophyllum 
 Bastard Balm
 Plants
 

Lamiaceae
Flora of Europe
Monotypic Lamiaceae genera
Taxa named by Carl Linnaeus